Ptychohyla is a genus of frogs (common names: stream frogs, mountain stream frogs) in the family Hylidae. These frogs are found in the southern Mexican states of Chiapas, Guerrero, and Oaxaca, and Central America to western Panama.

Ptychohyla has a pale pink iris and nuptial outgrowth in breeding males that differentiates this new species from other Mexican frog groups. This new species usually live in untouched tropical forest. They are known to be vulnerable in modified habitat by humans.

Species
The following species are recognised in the genus Ptychohyla:

References

  (1960): Synonymy, variation, and distribution of Ptychohyla leonhard-schultzei Ahl. Studies of American hylid frogs. IV - Herpetologica 16: 191–197

External links
  [web application]. 2008. Berkeley, California: Ptychohyla. AmphibiaWeb, available at http://amphibiaweb.org/. (Accessed: April 23, 2008).

 
Frogs of North America
Amphibians of Central America
Amphibian genera
Hylinae
Taxa named by Edward Harrison Taylor